Design Week is a UK-based website, formerly a magazine for the design industry. It was first published in October 1986 by Centaur Communications. According to the Audit Bureau of Circulations primary circulation for 2007 was 8,074. In 2011, Design Week became a digital-only publication. On 22 January 2019, Centaur Media announced that Design Week had become part of Xeim, a rebranded marketing division.

Details
Design Week is a business publication as distinct from design-focused publications like Wallpaper and Creative Review.  Its competitors include Brand Republic  and Marketing Week. Its readers come from commercial design disciplines which range from retail, products and packaging to graphics, interiors, exhibitions and digital.

The founding editor of Design Week was Jeremy Myerson and the title was edited for more than 20 years by Lynda Relph-Knight. The current editor is Tom Banks.

Back issues to 1995 include contemporary design news and interviews/retrospectives of noteworthy but not widely known designers since 1960, e.g. Raymond Hawkey and Frank Stephenson.

References

External links

Business magazines published in the United Kingdom
Online magazines published in the United Kingdom
Weekly magazines published in the United Kingdom
Defunct magazines published in the United Kingdom
Magazines established in 1986
Magazines disestablished in 2011
Online magazines with defunct print editions
Design magazines
Magazines published in London